This article lists the major power stations located in Gansu province.

Non-renewable

Coal-based

Renewable

Hydroelectric

Conventional

Wind

Solar

References 

Power stations
Gansu